The 1922 Milwaukee Badgers season was their inaugural season in the National Football League. The team finished 2–4–3, finishing eleventh in the league.

Schedule

Standings

References

Milwaukee Badgers seasons
Milwaukee Badgers
Milwaukee Badgers